Archery has been part of the Pan American Games since the 1979 Games in San Juan, Puerto Rico.

Medal table
1979 marked the beginning of the modern archery competition at the Pan American Games. Table includes discontinued events.

Current events

Men's Recurve Individual
Source:

Men's Recurve Team
Sources:

Women's Recurve Individual
Source:

Women's Recurve Team
Source:

Mixed Recurve Team

Men's Compound Individual
Source:

Women's Compound Individual
Source:

Mixed Compound Team

Discontinued Events

Men's Recurve – 30 Meters
Source:

Men's Recurve – 50 Meters
Source:

Men's Recurve – 70 Meters
Source:

Men's Recurve – 90 Meters
Source:

Women's Recurve – 30 Meters
Source:

Women's Recurve – 50 Meters
Source:

Women's Recurve – 60 Meters
Source:

Women's Recurve – 70 Meters
Source:

References

 
Sports at the Pan American Games
Pan American Games
Pan American Games
Pan American Games